Rudolf Berghammer (born 1952 in Oberndorf, Germany) is a German mathematician who works in computer science.

Life 
Rudolf Berghammer worked as an electrician at the Farbwerke Hoechst, Kelheim, from 1966 until 1970. He began studying Mathematics and Computer Science in 1973 at TU München. His academic teachers were Friedrich L. Bauer, Klaus Samelson, Gottfried Tinhofer, and Gunther Schmidt. After obtaining his diploma in 1979, he started working as an assistant mainly to Gunther Schmidt and Friedrich L. Bauer at TU München where he obtained his award-winning Ph.D. in 1984. From 1988 on, he worked as an assistant to Gunther Schmidt at the Faculty for Computer Science of the Universität der Bundeswehr München, where he finally got his habilitation in 1990. Since 1993 he is a professor for Computer-aided Program Development at the Department of Computer Science at the University of Kiel.

Work 
For many years he has served as head of the steering committee of the international RAMiCS conference series (formerly termed RelMiCS).

Rudolf Berghammer is known for his work in relational mathematics, or Formal Methods of Programming, Semantics, Relational Methods in Computer Science. He developed the RelView system for the manipulation and visualisation of relations and relational programming.

For instance, in 2019 he was coauthor of "Cryptomorphic topological structures: a computational relation algebraic approach".
This work relates the classical neighborhood system approach to topology to closure operators, kernel operators, and Aumann contact relations. The formulation of one approach to another is done with calculus of relations. The article notes the contributions of RelView experiments with finite topologies, for instance for a set with seven elements, 9,535,241 topologies are tested. (see § 9).

Personal 
One of his hobbies is mountaineering. In his youth he climbed Ortler or Piz Bernina and other noted summits. He is an active climber spending several days in the alps every year. Furthermore he is an enthusiastic sailor owning a own sailing vessel in the baltic sea.

Written books 
 Semantik von Programmiersprachen, Logos Verlag, 2001,  
 Ordnungen, Verbände und Relationen mit Anwendungen, Springer, 
 Mathematik für Informatiker: Grundlegende Begriffe und Strukturen, Springer,  (eBook)

Editorships 
 1991: (with Gunther Schmidt)  Graph-Theoretic Concepts in Computer Science, Lecture Notes in Computer Science #570, Proc. 17th Intern. Workshop WG '91, Richterheim Fischbachau, 
 2003: .
 2008: .
 2009: .
 2014: .

References

External links 
 Prof. Dr. Rudolf Berghammer at Christian Albrechts Universität Kiel with access to a full list of publications and talks
 Rudolf Berghammer at researchr.org

1952 births
21st-century German mathematicians
Academic staff of Bundeswehr University Munich
Computer science educators
Computer science writers
Formal methods people
Academic staff of the University of Kiel
German computer scientists
German textbook writers
Living people
Programming language researchers
Technical University of Munich alumni
Theoretical computer scientists